Narmin Othman (born c.1948, Arabic: نيرمين عثمان; Kurdish Nermîn Osman) is the Iraqi Minister for the Environment in the government of Nouri al-Maliki, a post she also held in the Iraqi Transitional Government. She was Minister of Women's Affairs in the Iraqi Interim Government and a Minister of Education in the Iraqi Kurdistan Region from 1992.

She escaped an assassination attempt in August 2005 when gunmen attacked her convoy 

Her family were active in the Kurdish peshmerga who fought Saddam Hussein who had her uncle and brother-in-law executed. Her husband (Daro Sheikh Noori) was imprisoned for five years where he was tortured. She and her husband went into exile in Sweden in 1984, returning to Iraq in 1992. Her husband was a PUK Politburo member, who died in 2004, the same year that she was offered a post in the national government.

References 

1948 births
Iraqi Kurdish women
Iraqi Kurdistani politicians
21st-century Iraqi women politicians
21st-century Iraqi politicians
Human rights ministers of Iraq
Living people
Women government ministers of Iraq
20th-century Iraqi women politicians
20th-century Iraqi politicians